Spyridon Lebesis (born May 30, 1987, in Mavromati, Boeotia) is a Greek javelin thrower.

His personal best is 83.02 meters, achieved in Nicosia in May 2012. This performance ranks him third among Greek javelin throwers, behind Kostas Gatsioudis and Ioannis Kiriazis.

Lebesis scored 82.40 in the qualification round of the London Summer Olympic, second place to the World Champion Andreas Thorkildsen of Norway.

Achievements

Seasonal bests by year
2006 - 72.50
2007 - 75.45
2008 - 76.97
2009 - 80.95
2010 - 82.90
2011 - 81.12
2012 - 83.02
2013 - 79.97
2014 - 80.64

References

1987 births
Living people
People from Boeotia
Greek male javelin throwers
Athletes (track and field) at the 2012 Summer Olympics
Olympic athletes of Greece
Mediterranean Games bronze medalists for Greece
Athletes (track and field) at the 2013 Mediterranean Games
Mediterranean Games medalists in athletics
Sportspeople from Central Greece
21st-century Greek people